Mount Myōjin or Myōjin-ga-take is a mountain with an altitude of 1,169 meters on the border of Minamiashigara and Hakone, Kanagawa, as one of the ancient sommas on Mount Hakone's old outer rim. It is part of Fuji-Hakone-Izu National Park.

Mount Myōjin has two major trails from the eastern and western sides, and is the hikers' most popular mountain in the Mount Hakone area, next to Mount Kintoki. There is also a long trail from Mount Myōjō via Mount Myōjin to Mount Kintoki.

See also
Fuji-Hakone-Izu National Park

References

External link

Mountains of Kanagawa Prefecture
Hakone, Kanagawa
Minamiashigara, Kanagawa